The Men's 100 metre backstroke S1 event at the 2020 Paralympic Games took place on 25 August 2021, at the Tokyo Aquatics Centre.

Final

No heats were needed, as there were only seven swimmers.

References

Swimming at the 2020 Summer Paralympics